Chiba Prefectural Board of Education is a department of the Chiba Prefecture in Japan.

The board supervises elementary and middle schools operated by other school districts and directly operates public high schools.

Schools directly operated by the prefecture

High schools

Abiko
 Abiko High School 
 Fusa High School 
 Kohoku High School

Asahi
 Asahi High School 
 Toso Technical High School

Chiba
 Chiba High School 
 Chiba East High School 
 Chiba North High School 
 Chiba Ohmiya High School 
 Chiba South High School 
 Chiba West High School 
 Kashiwai High School 
 Kemigawa High School 
 Wakamatsu High School 
 Chishirodai High School 
 Isobe High School 
 Izumi High School 
 Kotehashi High School 
 Makuhari Sohgoh High School 
 Oihama High School 
 Toke High School 
 Chiba Girls' High School 
 Chiba Technical High School 
 Keiyo Industrial High School 
 Chiba Commercial High School

Chosei District
 Ichinomiya Commercial High School  (Ichinomiya)

Choshi
 Choshi High School 
 Choshi Commercial High School 
 Choshi Fishery High School

Funabashi
 Funabashi High School 
 Funabashi Asahi High School 
 Funabashi East High School 
 Funabashi Houden High School 
 Funabashi Kowagama High School 
 Funabashi West High School 
 Funabashi Shibayama High School 
 Funabashi Tawa High School 
 Funabashi Toyo High School 
 Funabashi West High School 
 Yakuendai High School

Futtsu
 Amaha High School 
 Kimitsu Commercial High School

Ichihara
 Anesaki High School 
 Ichihara High School 
 Ichihara Midori High School 
 Ichihara Yawata High School 
 Keiyo High School 
 Tsurumai High School

Ichikawa
 Gyotoku High School 
 Kohnodai High School 
 Kokubun High School 
 Ichikawa High School 
 Ichikawa East High School 
 Ichikawa North High School 
 Ichikawa South High School 
 Ichikawa West High School

Inzai
 Inba High School

Isumi
 Misaki High School 
 Oohara High School

Isumi District
 Otaki High School  (Otaki)

Kamagaya
 Kamagaya High School 
 Kamagaya West High School

Kamogawa
 Nagasa High School

Kashiwa
 Hakuryou High School 
 Higashi-Katsushika High School 
 Kashiwa High School 
 Kashiwa Chuo High School 
 Kashiwa North High School 
 Kashiwa South High School 
 Kashiwa West High School 
 Shonan High School 
 Takayanagi High School

Katori
 Omigawa High School  (In Omigawa until the 2006 merger into Katori)
 Sawara High School  (In Sawara until the 2006 merger into Katori)
 Sawara Hakuyo High School  (In Sawara until the 2006 merger into Katori)

Katori District
 Tako High School  (Tako)

Katsuura
 Katsuura Wakashio High School

Kisarazu
 Kisarazu High School 
 Kisarazu East High School

Kimitsu
 Kazusa High School 
 Kimitsu High School 
 Kimitsu Aoba High School

Matsudo
 Kogane High School 
 Matsudo High School 
 Matsudo Akiyama High School 
 Matsudo Mabashi High School  
 Matsudo Mutsumi High School 
 Matsudo South High School 
 Matsudo Yakiri High School 
 Matsudo International High School

Minamiboso
 Awa Takushin High School

Mobara
 Chosei High School 
 Mobara High School 
 Mobara Agricultural High School

Nagareyama
 Nagareyama High School 
 Nagareyama Central High School 
 Nagareyama East High School 
 Nagareyama North High School 
 Nagareyama South High School

Narashino
 Mimomi High School 
 Tsudanuma High School

Narita
 Narita North High School 
 Narita Seiryo High School 
 Shimofusa High School  (In Shimofusa prior to the town's 2006 merger with Narita)
 Narita International High School

Noda
 Noda Central High School 
 Sekiyado High School 
 Shimizu High School

Sakura
 Sakura High School 
 Sakura East High School 
 Sakura West High School 
 Sakura South High School

Sanbu District
 Kujukuri High School  (Kujukuri)
 Shirasato High School  (Oamishirasato)
 Sanbu Agricultural High School  (Oamishirasato)

Sanmu
 Matsuo High School  (In Matsuo until the 2006 merger into Sanmu)
 Narutou High School  (In Naruto until the 2006 merger into Sanmu)

Shiroi
 Shiroi High School

Sodegaura
 Sodegaura High School

Sosa
 Sosa High School

Tateyama
 Awa High School 
 Awa South High School 
 Tateyama High School 
 Awa Fishery High School

Togane
 Togane High School 
 Togane Commercial High School

Tomisato
 Tomisato High School

Urayasu
 Urayasu High School 
 Urayasu South High School

Yachimata
 Yachimata High School

Yachiyo
 Yachiyo High School 
 Yachiyo West High School 
 Yachiyo East High School

Yotsukaido
 Yotsukaido High School 
 Yotsukaido North High School

External links
 Chiba Prefectural Board of Education (English)
  (Japanese)

Prefectural school systems in Japan
Chiba (city)
Education in Chiba Prefecture